is a fictional character and the protagonist of the Dead or Alive fighting game series by Team Ninja and Tecmo (Koei Tecmo). Kasumi has served as the lead character of the Dead or Alive franchise since its premiere in 1996. She was a main character in the first, second and fifth games of the series and in the film DOA: Dead or Alive.

In the games' canon, Kasumi, also known as "The Kunoichi of Destiny", is a teenage ninja princess of the Mugen Tenshin Ninja Clan. Kasumi abandoned her clan, becoming an outcast and is pursued by her younger half-sister Ayane.  There are several Dead or Alive player and boss characters who are clones of her. She also guest appeared in various other games, including Team Ninja's other flagship series Ninja Gaiden where she and Ayane play much bigger roles.

Kasumi has become a symbol of the Dead or Alive franchise and is the personal favourite of Team Ninja's founder and the series' creator Tomonobu Itagaki. She has been the subject of various merchandise and was used to promote the Xbox consoles in Japan. Kasumi is a popular sex symbol in video game culture and an iconic ninja character. Due to differences in cultural norms, she has attracted some controversy in the West involving eroticism and the use of underage female characters in video games.

Appearances

In video games

Dead or Alive fighting games
Kasumi is the main character, the protagonist in the first game, and a secondary character in the second game of the series. In the series' backstory, she was destined to become the 18th Master of the Mugen Tenshin Ninja Clan, succeeding her father Shiden after Hayate was left comatose after an attack by their renegade uncle Raidou. In the first Dead or Alive, on a personal quest of revenge, Kasumi, highly skilled in the  style ninjutsu, absconded on her own to enter the Dead or Alive tournament and defeat Raidou, breaking the clan rules by leaving without permission and is now outcasted as an outlaw. After winning the first DOA tournament, Kasumi kills Raidou and avenges not only the supposed death of Hayate, but also the rape of her mother Ayame.

After the first Dead or Alive World Combat Championship, she is abducted by Dead or Alive Tournament Executive Committee (DOATEC)'s Super Human Development Project, who use her genes to create a clone called Kasumi Alpha as part of its project to develop supersoldiers. In Dead or Alive 2, Kasumi escapes, defeats her clone and attempts to return to her village; but she is banished because a dishonored shinobi cannot rejoin their clan. She is labeled a traitor because leaving the village without permission is punishable by death, and she is constantly hunted by assassins including her half-sister Ayane. Despite this, she still wishes to see Hayate  now the clan's leader  and Ayane. In Dead or Alive 3, she enters the third tournament to meet them for the last time.

She meets her brother again in Dead or Alive 4, and after trying to persuade him to not launch an assault DOATEC and return to the Mugen Tenshin village with her, she is attacked by Ayane, but is victorious. Kasumi follows Hayate to the DOATEC Tri-Tower to confront Helena Douglas, who has taken control of DOATEC. Kasumi fights her way past Helena and heads for the laboratory to destroy her powerful clone, the upgraded Alpha-152.  Kasumi fights to the best of her ability, but Alpha-152 escapes in the chaos caused by a Mugen Tenshin attack. Upon spotting Helena entering the blazing helipad, Kasumi risks her life trying to intervene, but Ayane stops her and saves her life seconds before the building explodes.

Kasumi returns in Dead or Alive 5, where due to her status as a runaway, she is still unable to return to her village. She still lives on the run and continues to be a target. Kasumi joins forces with Helena to find Alpha-152, refusing help from other characters, including her brother. After defeating her clone, she is attacked and killed by Hayate and Ayane. However, it is revealed that Kasumi that was defeated was an Alpha clone programmed to believe she is the original, while the real Kasumi is in Japan within Ninja Gaidens Muramasa hidden village. Kasumi receives a message from the ninja master Ryu Hayabusa, telling her that Hayate is in danger and she is needed in battle once again. After fighting several contenders, she eventually reaches the oil platform where her brother is located, and discovers a secret laboratory belonging to Victor Donovan's new organization, MIST. Kasumi finds that he has created several Alpha clones to sell to the militaries of powerful countries. She frees Hayate from his where they team up with Ayane and Ryu to destroy Alpha-152 and the laboratory. Afterwards, Kasumi decides to find Donovan and defeat him once and for all.

Kasumi returns again in Dead or Alive 6, where she predicted an old evil that had been haunting the Mugen Tenshin Clan for many years, Raidou, would return. Thus she ended up writing a letter to her mother Ayame. While she was about to join Hayate and Ayane against MIST, the crime organization behind the fifth and sixth tournament, she was attacked by the mass-produced Kasumi Alpha Phase-4 army, and a prototype robot that resembled Raidou. Ryu saved her twice during these fights. While on her way to MIST's other hidden lab, she, Ryu and Hayate noticed a butterfly spirit signaling that Ayane was in danger. Ayane ended up being captured alongside another girl who happened to be Raidou's illegitimate first daughter, Honoka. The two illegitimate daughters of Raidou are forced to resurrect Raidou as an undead cyber nukenin. While Hayate works to stop the Phase-4 clones and save Honoka, Kasumi manages to save Ayane from being brainwashed by a new young MIST scientist named NiCO. As Ayane still has some energy left, she joins both Kasumi and Hayate in the fight against the resurrected Raidou, together they finally destroy him and leaves no traces of his remains behind.

Kasumi clones

In the series' storyline, DOATEC uses Kasumi's DNA to create many clones as part of its Project Alpha, which aims to create a perfect fighter. Kasumi Alpha is a boss character in Dead or Alive 2 and also appears in Dead or Alive Ultimate. She is defeated by Kasumi and the project undergoes another phase known as Project Alpha-2. Most of Kasumi's chapters in the story mode of Dead or Alive 5 are actually following her other, unknowing clone.

At the end of Dead or Alive 4, Alpha-152 flees DOATEC's Tri-Tower after a brief fight with Kasumi. Although not designed as one by the series' original designer and director, Tomonobu Itagaki, Alpha-152 is known as a very challenging final boss in several characters' story mode and the time attack mode in DOA4, and is an especially difficult opponent for slower characters. Alpha-152 can be unlocked as a playable character in Dead or Alive Dimensions. She returns in Dead or Alive 5, in which she can be unlocked again as a playable character. In the story mode of DOA5, Alpha-152 is again the last opponent. She takes on Kasumi's exact form and can also transform into Ayane, Hayate and Ryu during the final battle.

 has first appeared in Dead or Alive 5 during the story mode's introduction cutscene, where she attacks and destroys Bayman's special forces team in a war zone. She has debuted as a playable character in the Arcade version of Dead or Alive 5 Ultimate, after which she was made available as downloadable content (DLC) in console version after with the new character Marie Rose. Unlike the other clones, Phase-4 wants to live as a human being. She has her own, very different fighting style, which mixes the moves of Kasumi and Ayane. According to Joystiq, Phase-4's various costumes "bear the trademark hypersexuality that Team Ninja infuses into all of its games" but "generally revolve around a hood, making her the most brooding, angsty version of Kasumi to date." She was not originally planned to return in Dead or Alive 6, however was eventually included as a bonus character in a pre-order DLC package, listed as Phase 4. In the sixth game's main storyline, the mass-produced Phase 4 clones are the enemy characters, while the previous black-hooded Phase 4 who attacked Bayman's army and ran away is presumably mentioned by Lisa.

DOA spin-offs and Ninja Gaiden
Kasumi appears in the 2003 sports video game Dead or Alive Xtreme Beach Volleyball (DOAX). There, Kasumi is invited to a fourth DOA tournament; upon arriving she discovers the invitation is a hoax, and she and the game's other characters play beach volleyball. Kasumi also appears in the sequel, Dead or Alive Xtreme 2 (2006), and in the portable version Dead or Alive Paradise (2010). She is one of the first nine playable female characters in Dead or Alive Xtreme 3 (2015). In this case, Kasumi, while reading her fortune, returns once again to New Zack Island, and she decides to spend some time in order to find of about her fortune. In mobile game The Girls of Dead or Alive: Blackjack (2009), Kasumi makes a non-player appearance as blackjack dealer.

Dead or Alive: Code Chronos, a DOA series' prequel game which was to star Kasumi and Ayane in the leading roles. Itagaki said in 2003, "the fact that we registered this trademark for Kasumi-den should tell you that we have a big plan for it." Code Chronos was cancelled following Itagaki's departure from Tecmo

In the Ninja Gaiden series, Kasumi first made a cameo appearance at the end of 2009's Ninja Gaiden Sigma 2. Kasumi appears as a playable character in the 2012 action game Ninja Gaiden 3: Razor's Edge, which was made available as free DLC for the Wii U, and was included in the PlayStation 3 and Xbox 360 versions. In it, she is armed with a long sword and kunai throwing knives and by default wears hooded black armor with a cape-like blue scarf; the player can also select three of her costumes from DOA5. In 2013, Kasumi was featured in the smart phone action card game Hyakuman-nin no Ninja Gaiden, in which Hitomi from Dead or Alive and Rio from Rio: Rainbow Gate! also appear dressed in Kasumi's DOA costumes.

Other games
Kasumi appears as an optionally playable 'monster' in the games Monster Rancher 2 (1999) and Monster Rancher 4 (2003). Kasumi also appears as a playable character in a minor role in Warriors Orochi 3 Ultimate (Musou Orochi 3 Ultimate, 2013), where she suddenly falls through a space-time distortion while pursuing Alpha-152 and arrives in another world wearing her standard costume and armed with a short sword. She is a playable character in the crossover crowd-fighting game Warriors All-Stars (Musou Stars, 2017) in a larger role, including appearing on the game's cover art.

Her classic blue ninja getup is an unlockable costume for Arin in Super Swing Golf (2006) and Super Swing Golf: Season 2 (2007), and is an alternative costume of Mio Amakura in the Director's Cut version of Fatal Frame II: Crimson Butterfly for the Xbox (2004). It is also available for character avatars in Koei's social game My GAMECITY and in Sega's Phantasy Star Online 2 (added in 2017), as well as for player characters in Game Arts' Ragnarok Odyssey Ace (2013) and for Senran Kaguras Asuka in Honey Parade Games' Shinobi Master Senran Kagura: New Link (a 2018 collaboration). Sega's free-to-play game Samurai & Dragons added a rare Kasumi card in 2013. DOA6 director and producer Yohei Shimbori said he would like Kasumi to appear in Nintendo's Smash Bros. series. Kasumi also appeared as a playable guest character in Netmarble/SNK's The King of Fighters All Star (a 2021 collaboration).

Character design
Tomonobu Itagaki originally envisioned the character to be male, before changing her sex. As Kasumi became more and more kawaii, he decided to make her the lead character. The rest of his team was only half-convinced at first but warmed up to the idea eventually. Kasumi and the other ninja characters are "like superheroes" compared to the more realistic fighters, regarded as a "fantasy element" by Dead or Alive 6 art director and scenario writer Yutaka Saito.

Some scholars used her and Tomb Raiders Lara Croft as examples of the characters embodying "unique aesthetic for perfection" - a hyperreal, exaggerated 'hyperbody'.Lisa Nakamura, Digitizing Race: Visual Cultures of the Internet, University of Minnesota Press, 2008, page 136. Like the other female characters in the Dead or Alive franchise, Kasumi was designed with large breasts; her official measurements are 35-21-33. She is usually wearing a wakizashi in a small of her back. Her hair has been variously blonde, auburn and red, with hairstyle options including a ponytail, a braid, and loose hair. She wears many types of costumes through the series, including female ninja outfits, feminine casual clothes, Japanese schoolgirl uniforms,Itagaki Speaks! , 1UP.com, 2005. and bikinis. Commonly, her default (and sometimes only, in most of her guest appearances) costume has been her blue-and-white "Brilliant Lapis" (originally white-and-red, later known as "Immaculate White"), made of a revealing and puff-sleeved Japanese tunic (later with swan-themed ornaments), a sash, thigh-high tabi, sandals with shin guards, hand guards with metal wristbands, and a choker. According to IGN, she had the best outfits of the characters in Dead or Alive Ultimatethe expanded compilation of the first two DOA gamesin which "she looks great and her outfits are fantastic." A planned new main costume for Kasumi in Dead or Alive: Dimensions upset some fans when the game was announced in 2010.

She was the youngest character in the original version of the first game. Itagaki said his "daughter" Kasumi "has been a main character of the Dead or Alive series, and please understand, she is like a Venus to me." When asked if he was comfortable with sexualizing a 17-year-old character, Itagaki answered, "In Japan, that's okay. Maybe it's 20 in America." He said, "I was 27 when I created Kasumi. I'm older now, but 17-year-old girls are still gorgeous." Itagaki said the Dead or Alive series contributed its character Ayane, rather than the "very soft" Kasumi, for a cameo appearance in 2004's Ninja Gaiden because Kasumi did not fit with the game's "very hard-edged" basis as "DOA is based on a 'softer' concept, and she is rather symbolic of the game as a whole". He said that if Ninja Gaiden had featured Kasumi, it would have become less a "story of [Ryu] Hayabusa and ninjas" and more a story of Kasumi ("Kasumi-den") and a "DOA action game". Itagaki has described himself as personally "a fan of Kasumi" as his favorite DOA character. He also said he felt "responsible for her" and was "very close to her". When hackers found a way to remove her clothing in DOA2, Itagaki felt this "was an attack on her". Tecmo's lawyers sued software company West Side, the authors of the hack, for violating copyright, and won the case and damages of two million yen (over ). Kasumi's nude model can be also accessed using a GameShark cheat device in the Dreamcast version of DOA2, and one fan-made mod for DOA5 modified her training suit to remove most of the clothing.

In 2012, 16 years after her debut appearance, Kasumi was redesigned to look less cartoon-like and more realistic with a "grown up" appearance in DOA5. The game's art director Yuta Saito said, "From DOA4 we wanted to evolve the characters in a slightly realistic direction. The most difficult, and you don't have to ask, is Kasumi. Kasumi is the face of DOA and the eternal heroine. And for such a popular character like Kasumi, to change her form we really needed a lot of courage and it really was a big challenge. But if we didn't do that, we couldn't make DOA5 and we wouldn't be able to show you anything." Producer Yasuke Hayashi said the process of remodeling Kasumi has sparked most disputes in the development team, especially since she is "a character that is not so much out on the table, with hidden feelings, and it's been difficult to express such a 'hidden look'." GamesRadar noted that "the manga influences on her facial featureswhile still apparenthave been scaled right back [a]nd her boobs seem less ludicrously unmanageable." Itagaki, who has left Team Ninja in 2008, said in 2014: "Straightly speakin’, my daughter was totally ruined, spoiled. I can't/shouldn't avert my eyes from that fact. Many DOA fans here are crying, I will do something for DOA after I finished Devil's Third." Kasumi's main costume has been different for the first time in Dead or Alive 6 (described as an armored "full-body skin-tight catsuit with combat heels"), but her iconic blue outfit still does appear in the game.

Gameplay
Gameplay-wise, Kasumi was noted as one of the top characters in the series. According to IGN, "Beyond her dazzling beauty, Kasumi combines powerful kick attacks and great speed, with some of the best punch and kick combinations in the game. With good throws to complement her punches and kicks, no player—scrub or master—can go wrong with Kasumi." IGN furthermore called Kasumi "one of the deadliest fighters in all of DOA, because she has surprising reach and can attack from greater distances than the other girls," adding she "is one of the rare characters to come equipped with a blade and with lightning fast attacks, she can take down opponents in record time." According to Anthony Chau's GameSpy guide for Dead or Alive 3, "Kasumi's all-around game combined with her quickness makes her one of the best fighters for any level of player. Strong stunning attacks, great combinations, and her speed, she's got it all." In GameSpot's guide to Dead or Alive 4, Matthew Rorie wrote Kasumi is "an interesting character for many reasons. While she doesn't rely on brute strength to get the job done, she has a dizzying array of quick strikes and more than a few teleportation moves to dazzle your opponents and pull them off guard, allowing you to sneak behind them and attack from the rear, or just confuse them mightily."

IGN described her "a great character for any level of player" of Dead or Alive 2 as "novices will certainly enjoy her easy mechanics, while master players will find some of the most evil combinations in the game with Kasumi." According to Andrew Alfonso's GameSpy guide to Dead or Alive Ultimate, Kasumi's key moves include high kicks and a cartwheel attack, which is perfect against low attackers. Kasumi's preferred and recommended tag team partner is Ryu Hayabusa.Anoop Gantayat and Jeremy Conrad, Dead or Alive 2 Strategy Guide: Kasumi, Snowball.com/IGNguides, 2000. GameSpy's Chau wrote that in DOA3, "Kasumi's got some very good long-range attacks; combined with her speed and she's able to hit opponents from a good distance away," especially since many of her attacks can stun with one hit, allowing her "to deliver her great punch and kick combinations, regarded by some as being the best in the game," that are exceptionally dangerous since many of them end in a powerful launching attack. In addition, "to balance her great speed and superb punch-kick combination game, Kasumi also can throw with the best of them." Chau opined Kasumi is a good tag team partner for any fighter, but in particular for Ryu, Bass, Helena and Ayane. GamesRadar US recommended that DOA3 "beginners should start with Kasumi because she's got some nice combos". According to Bryan Dawson in Prima Games' official guide for Dead or Alive 4, this game's Kasumi is "faster than ever" and her techniques have been modified considerably; she was ranked overall 8/10, while her clone Alpha-152 was ranked 10/10. In GameSpy's guide to DOA4, David McCutcheon wrote that "Kasumi is a very well-rounded character that is diverse in usefulness," that she "can be a pure powerhouse character outside of her looks that will certainly drive the point across even to the most defensive of fighters," and that novice players might especially appreciate her very accessible high combos. In an official description of Kasumi in Dead or Alive 5, she uses "beautiful yet varied attacks executed at a high speed that few can guard against." Dean James from Attack of the Fanboy recommended her especially "for those who haven’t played the series in the past and are just starting with Dead or Alive 5 Last Round" for her "probably the most balanced setup in the series."

In the Dead or Alive Xtreme beach volleyball series, Kasumi has excellent technique and jump abilities, but average speed and defense, and very low power. Pairing Kasumi with her rival Ayane can lower their performance. According to Official Xbox Magazine, "Kasumi has almost the exact same strengths as Ayane [which means she is excellent at long spikes, digging, and soft dinks], but she's even weaker at the net. She must be partnered with a good spiker and kept in the back whenever possible." Shelby Reiches of Cheat Code Central wrote Kasumi's fighting style in Ninja Gaiden 3: Razor's Edge "appears to fall somewhere between the more acrobatic Ayane and Ryu’s baseline swordsmanship," but she also "brings rampant teleportation and a focused, laser-like Ninpo [magic attacks] to the table," and David Lynch of X360 noted all the "girls" of Razor's Edge (Ayane, Kasumi and Momiji) are "just as deadly" as Ryu has always been in the Ninja Gaiden series.

In film

Kasumi appeared as a lead character in the 2006 action-comedy film DOA: Dead or Alive, which is loosely based on the game series. In it, she was played by Devon Aoki, an American actress of mixed ethnicity who has previously portrayed the ninja Miho in the film Sin City. Itagaki later expressed a preference for a Japanese actress, ideally Kumiko Gotoh, but had no authority over the casting process. According to Aoki, she was asked to go the film's casting interview by her 15-year-old brother. She played the game for the first time, after which she understood why Kasumi is so popular. Aoki said about Kasumi in the film: "Yes, she's pretty badass ... and she's a princess. She's never been outside the palace walls. She's been very, very sheltered, because she's a princess and that's the way it is ... until the point where she actually decides to leave, she's basically been pretty sheltered but she's a capable fighter."

According to Kung Fu Tai Chi, DOA: Dead or Alive "focuses its pugilistic mayhem on the eye-candy surrounding the mythos of Princess Kasumi". In the movie, Kasumi escapes her clan and joins the tournament upon receiving an invitation. She fights against Leon and wins. Later, Kasumi stabs the villain Victor Donovan with an acupuncture needle. He is paralyzed and perishes in an explosion. In the end, she goes home with her brother despite being a runaway shinobi, but has to fight against her clan with her new friends to be allowed to stay.

In the 2002 comedy film Run Ronnie Run, the character Jerry Trellis (E. J. De La Pena) is shown playing Dead or Alive 2 Hardcore as Kasumi in two different scenes. At the end of the film, Jerry uses some of her moves in a fight.

Promotion and merchandise
As a DOA mascot character, Kasumi has been featured in a wide range of merchandise, including figurines, statuettes and action figures that have been released by Tecmo, Sega, Kaiyodo, Max Factory, Kotobukiya,Michael McWhertor, DOAX’s Kasumi Paint Job Studied, Kotaku, April 2, 2007. Takara, wall scrolls, and others. One figure was bundled with a special edition of Dead or Alive Paradise for the PlayStation Portable (also sold separately); another exclusive figure was bundled with the magazine Hobby Japan in 2010. Some Kasumi figures can be stripped down to their underwear or stripped topless.

Other items include an Xbox 360 face plate, a PSP protective cover, swimwear for women, "3D breasts" gel-filled mousepads and a "3D" mug, trading cards, a Dead or Alive 5 arcade stick by Hori decorated with a graphic of Ayane and Kasumi, and a "squishy pillow". A lifesize  dakimakura "love pillow" was bundled by Microsoft with the 5,000-unit "Kasumi-chan Blue" limited edition batch of the Xbox consoles sold in Japan with a matching Xbox Controller;Chris Kohler, Getting in Bed With the Customer, Wired.com, 02.06.04. a bed sheet of Kasumi and Ayane was offered as part of the Deluxe Edition of Dead or Alive 6 in Japan. Kasumi and Hitomi were also used in an iPhone digital clock application Bijin Tokei, and a Dead or Alive voice clock was bundled with a figure of either Kasumi or Ayane. In 2007, Side A: Love! Kasumi was released as one of two picture books to mark DOA tenth anniversary and Kasumi-themed credit cards were too released on this occasion, while a 1/6 scale special limited figure was released in only 20 copies as part of the film's promotional campaign.

 

Dead or Alive 4 pre-orders in Japan included bonuses marketed as "the most beautiful slipcase in the world" and "the most beautiful poster in the world", the case having an almost-naked Kasumi on one side and Ayane in her standard fighting outfit on the other. Dead or Alive 5 pre-order bonuses included an exclusive Kasumi-themed iPhone case from the online retailer ShopTo.Net. Merchandise released for DOA5 include another Kasumi-themed 3D mousepad and body pillow cases. Kasumi was featured on the covers of Dead or Alive 5 Postcard School Calendar 2013 and on 2005's comic anthology companion for Dead or Alive Ultimate. Dead or Alive 5 Ultimate "Kasumi-chan Blue" limited edition includes Kasumi-themed 3D mousepad, playing cards, lifesize tapestry and bath poster; the game's collector's edition also contains a Kasumi 3D mousepad and playing cards. There is also a life-size 3D mousepad of Kasumi from DOA Xtreme 3.

She is one of four playable characters available in the 2013 free-to-play game Dead or Alive 5 Ultimate: Core Fighters, and free downloadable costumes for Kasumi were offered as pre-order bonuses for the full version of DOA5 Ultimate at Amazon. First-print copies of Tecmo Koei's Musou Orochi 2 Ultimate (Japanese version of Warriors Orochi 3 Ultimate) were bundled with DLC costume codes for Kasumi's special "Orochi" themed costume in DOA5 Ultimate. Kasumi is also one of the four characters available for free play in Dead or Alive 5 Last Round. Last Round pre-order bonuses included her special "Ninja 2015" masked outfit at Amazon, Best Buy and GameStop, with an additional skimpy "Aloha" costume available at GameStop only. Her other wardrobe in Last Round includes a destructible dress designed by Tamiki Wakaki and downloadable costumes of Dark Side Princess Laegrinna from Tecmo Koei's Deception IV: The Nightmare Princess, Alisa Reinford from Nihon Falcom's The Legend of Heroes: Trails of Cold Steel, Io Yaginuma from Square Enix's School Girl Strikers, Erza Scarlet and Yatterman-2 from Tatsunoko's Fairy Tail and Yatterman, and Kasumi Todoh from SNK's The King of Fighters, while Phase 4 can be dressed up as Altina Orion from The Legend of Heroes: Trails of Cold Steel II and another outfit by Wakaki. Kasumi is also one of the four initial playable characters in the Core Fighters version of Dead or Alive 6 as well.

In 2010, an erotic gamebook Destiny Kunoichi Kasumi (運命のくノ一かすみ) was published (as part of the Queen's Gate series in the Queen's Blade franchise), for which another Kasumi figure was released. Kasumi's signature very high kick attack was featured in a television commercial for Dead or Alive 3. Microsoft's promotion of the Xbox in Japan included the 'Kasumi and Hawaii' campaign at the Tokyo Game Show 2003, where several gamers would be "invited by lottery to fly off to a sunny beach to be pampered like a king while playing the latest games." 

Reception

Critical acclaim and popularity
Kasumi has been well received by gaming fans and professional critics for her sex appeal and her martial arts abilities, both in Japan and in the West. In 1998, Computer and Video Games (CVG) featured Kasumi as its Star of the Month, calling her "so sexy, and so deadly (and so a-lively)," also telling the readers they are "bound to fall in love with Kasumi," and Sega Saturn Magazine featured her on the cover with a caption stating "Drop dead gorgeous!" in capital letters. Japanese manga artist Kōsuke Fujishima too "fell in love with her". N64 Magazine described Dead or Alive 2 as "Kasumi and co" and called her "more than welcome" on the GameCube, CVG stated she "looks fantastic" in this game, and Dreamcast Magazine preview stated Kasumi "makes a welcome return for her second all conquering appearance under the spotlight." Brazilian edition of the Xbox Official Magazine compared Kasumi's role in Dead or Alive 2 to that of Ryu in Street Fighter games as a protagonistic type of "character we all chose at the beginning, one of most versatile in all aspects, and possessing an overwhelming charisma." In the Dreamcast "Character Battle" in DC Magazine, Kasumi got to semi-finals before she was defeated by Ulala. Reporting on Dead or Alive Ultimate in 2004, Video Games Daily called her "everyone's favourite fighting chick". Kasumi was the second most popular character among online players of Ultimate, about which IGN declared that "they love Kasumi because she has the best overall outfits in the game" and noted her for having "has, by far, the most bizarre background of any DOA girl." In 2013, Retro Gamer chose Kasumi as one of the 19 "coolest fighters from the last 30 years" and noted she is "clearly the face of Dead or Alive." Japanese magazine Famitsu declared Kasumi as the 35th top video game heroine of the 1990s, with her being one of the only three non-Capcom fighting game characters on this list.

According to Kotaku, Kasumi has become "nothing short of an icon" in Japan by 2006. Talking about her popularity in the country, Itagaki said in 2004, "It's almost like there are too many Kasumi covers. If you look at Japanese magazines, maybe 10% of them have Kasumi on their cover." She was voted the DOA series' most popular character among the Japanese fans in the publisher Koei Tecmo's official poll in 2014, receiving over 19% of votes. Kasumi has achieved a high popularity overseas as well. In 2005, she won G4's show Video Game Vixens in the category 'Dressed to Kill'. That same year, Kasumi also won the "Who is the hottest female character on Xbox?" poll by Official Xbox Magazine, when 52% of all votes were cast on her (Street Fighters Chun-Li came second with 11%), with the magazine's staff commenting that it was no surprise to them. She won the G-Phoria 2007 award in the category "Best Hottest Babe", garnering 55% of all votes,Stephen Johnson, G-Phoria Results are IN! , G4tv.com, August 8, 2007. came third after Mai Shiranui from The King of Fighters and Chun-Li in a Korean Internet fan poll for White Day 2009, just as she later did in poll for the most erotic girl in the history of fighting games conducted by Japanese web portal Goo in 2016 (coming fourth in 2018), and was voted second in the "Miss of Video Games 2012" poll by Polish magazine PSX Extreme. PSX Extreme'''s Daniel Żelazny ranked her blue shinobi attire as the eight best female costume in video games in 2014, noting she is one of favourite game characters among cosplayers.

Kasumi has been repeatedly named as one of gaming's top female ninja characters. In 2007, Rob Wright of Tom's Games featured her as one of the 50 greatest female characters in video game history and one of "the video game vixens of today" for being "one of the most powerfuland sexyninjas in the world." UGO ranked her tenth in its list of 2007 "video game hotties", describing her as "freakin' hot" and "the most attractive ninja you'll ever see." Chris Buffa of GameDaily ranked her at number eight in his 2008 list of top "hottest game babes" due to their love of "female ninjas, especially ones with gigantic breasts," and wrote, "Kasumi remains the most recognizable Dead or Alive girl, and one of the most dangerous." In 2010, G4tv.com called her "the iconic female ninja", and PLAY ranked this "everyone’s favourite ginger ninja" as the second "hottest redhead" in games. Machinima.com's Steve and Larson placed her third on its 2011 list of "top ten ninjas in all of gaming", and Gelo Gonzales of FHM included Kasumi among the nine "sexiest ninja babes in games" in a 2012 list, calling her "about as pure as ninjas go" and comparing her to Bela Padilla.

Kasumi has been positively received for her other traits, too. Sega Saturn Magazine named the "beautiful" Kasumi the "brains" of the first DOA, with Tina being the game's "muscle", and stated bother are "guaranteed to offend sexists everywhere" as she is "easily capable of holding their own against the game's macho male fighters." Joystick Division's James Hawkins described Kasumi as "a deadly fighter when she has to be, and a caring, passionate person when she doesn't. In a game full of sexy, fatalistic fighters, separating from the pack is a truly impressive feat. And Kasumi has done just that." The Age ranked her 36th on its 2008 list of the top 50 Xbox characters of all time and PC Games Hardware listed her as one of the most important female characters in video game history. GameDaily featured her in a 2009 article about gaming's "greatest patriots" and stated that "it's hard to imagine a video game world without the lovely Kasumi." In 2011, Polish web portal Wirtualna Polska listed her as one of the 15 "girls that will kick your ass" and noted that even though she was created as a strong female character just to appeal to "low tastes of some male players," she is still "a tough chick". Together with Ayane, Hitomi and Leifang, Kasumi placed tenth on the list "video game hotties" by the Spanish edition of IGN. The Daily Observer included her among the 32 candidates for "ultimate fighting game champion". Kurt Kalata of Hardcore Gaming 101 criticized her as an "insufferable Mary Sue," particularly in Dimensions.

Writing about the character's popularity in cosplay community, where hers, Ayane's and Leifang's have been the most popular DOA cosplays among the Japanese fans since the 1990s, Brian Ashcraft of Kotaku wrote in 2012: "Kasumi is one of the most iconic characters in Japanese gaming. Her ninja outfit in its various colors is instantly recognizable. She isn't merely in Dead or Alive; she is Dead or Alive." Kasumi was one of the favorite early cosplay roles of Italian model Francesca Dani. American actress and model Leila Arcieri chose the "incredible" Kasumi as a game character she would team up with if needed. WomanGamers.com appreciated Kasumi's portrayal "as a woman of action and deeds" who is "willing to risk everything in order to search for her missing brother". The website opined the character suffered from "the 'jiggle wiggle peek-a-boo factor' for which the series is both famous and infamous", but nevertheless rated her 8.14/10 as "a very pleasing character." It also positively noted "the popularity of the DOA characters with Japanese females, coupled with the fact that these ladies are not portrayed as damsels in distress but instead are shown to be dangerous opponents with their own agendas." The pseudonym of professional gamer Marjorie Bartell "Kasumi Chan" was inspired by the character. The alias of another professional gamer, Marie-Laure Norindr "Kayane" from France, was created from a conjunction of the names of her two favourite DOA characters, Kasumi and Ayane. Kasumi is the favourite DOA character of the American comic book writer Gail Simone.

Sex symbol
Multiple publications have chosen Kasumi as a video game sex symbol. Chris Carle of IGN wrote, "this sultry redhead is also a fan favorite, and it's not difficult to see why. In addition to being gifted as a fighter, she's been graced with one of the finest digital bodies ever. Also, she is a freaking ninja." TeamXbox ranked her as the third-top "Xbox babe" in 2004, declaring: "When we imagine our ideal Tecmo babe, Kasumi fits the bill perfectly. She has fought her way into the hearts and minds of millions of gamers," and further included her among its 11 "hotties in the Xbox universe" in 2009. Chris Reiter of Gaming Target ranked her as the fourth best "PlayStation 2 babe" in 2005 and PSX Extreme included her among the fives "hottest women" in 2006. In 2010, Joystick Division's James Hawkins ranked her as the sixth most sexy video game character, adding that "there is something really sexy about Kasumi that the other characters in the series seem to be missing." UGO's Aubrey Sitterson ranked her as ninth in his 2011 list of the "hottest" female fighters in fighting games.Aubrey Sitterson, Fighting Games' Finest Female Fighters , UGO.com, January 14, 2011. In 2012, Kasumi was declared the sexiest character in video games by Fernando DaQuino of Tecmundo, as well as being ranked as the 17th "hottest" female video game character by Kristie Bertucci of Gadget Review. ZoominGames ranked her as the third top "game babe" in 2012, as well as the number one top Asian female in gaming (for her sex appeal) in 2013. Also in 2013, Steve Jenkins of CheatCodes.com declared her the third "hottest video game girl" of all time, adding that even though our voting only allowed us to rank her #3, she'll always be #1 in our hearts." MTV UK placed her 31st on their 2015 list of the sexiest video game characters regardless of their genders.

Gavin Mackenzie of PLAY wrote Kasumi's "breasts explode the myth that ninjas like to go unnoticed, as they make it impossible not to notice Kasumi." In 2004, Official PlayStation Magazine (Australia) chose Kasumi as one of top ten game characters "to invite to your party," representing "beautiful bouncing girls." "This voluptuous vixen [with] a killer body and the moves to match" was often featured as GameDaily's 'Babe of the Week' feature, including in the galleries "Girl Power", "Asian Beauties" and "Kasumi".Robert Workman, Babe of the Week: Asian Beauties, GameDaily, February 6, 2009. In 2010, UGO featured Kasumi in its lists of top 50 "videogame hotties" and 30 best swimsuits in all works of fiction. According to that website, "Kasumi is the flagship protagonist of the Dead or Alive series of games, and it's for good reason. Her huge breasts, flowing hair, and butt-bumpin' volleyball skills represent at least half of what the series is all about. It only helps that she's equally deadly when the fighting portion comes around." GamePro ranked her third in its 2007 list of "top asses in gaming" and Joystick Division's Hawkins ranked her ninth on his 2011 list of the "greatest asses" in video game history. In 2011, Ross Lincoln of GameFront ranked Kasumi's breasts as the 14th finest, while Rich Shivener of Joystick Division chose them (together with Tina Armstrong's) as the seventh "most incredible chest" in video games. Sega Saturn Magazine stated in 1997 that her breasts are "putting even Lara Croft to shame, [and] can only be referred to as the biggest, bountiful breasts we've ever gawped at," while China's NetEase ranked her as second top "eye candy" game character in history largely due to the impression her sexy costumes and breast physics have made in early DOA games. In 2012, Zachary Miller of Nintendo World Report ranked Kasumi as the second "top chesty heroine" on Nintendo systems solely for her appearance in Dimensions for the Nintendo 3DS, noting that "Tina and Kasumi are the only ladies with bikini costumes, and they both display the usual DoA jiggle more than the other ladies." That same year, Italian edition of Tom's Games included Kasumi among top ten best necklines in video games: "We could have chosen the more abundant forms of Tina, or provocative costumes of Christie, but we preferred Kasumi in her classic costume."

Spanish magazine PlanetStation put Dead or Alive 2 among the five sexiest PlayStation games for any fight between Kasumi and Ayane. In 2009 in Poland, she was listed as one of 21 "sexy ladies of computer games" by Fakt, while benchmark.pl included her on its list of the most sexy female video game protagonists. Interia.pl included Ayane, Christie and Kasumi ex-aequo among the "sexiest game heroines" of 2012. Czech web portal iDNES.cz chose her, Taki and Lara as the top three best well-endowed video game heroines in 2008 and French gaming magazine Retropolis placed Kasumi seventh in a 2013 ranking of sexiest girls in fighting games in which busts were the primary criteria. In 2015, Indonesian television Liputan 6 included Kasumi among the ten most beautiful Oriental women in video games, while Vietnamese daily Thanh Niên ranked this "powerful yet kind-hearted ninja warrior" as the third most sexy female game character. In 2016, users of the Japanese website Nicnico voted her as the third most erotic game character in history.

Film version
The film adaptation's version of Kasumi garnered mostly negative reception, as did the film itself. Complex complained that Kasumi's appearance is "nowhere near as central to the movie as she is the game franchise, which of course we attribute to the intractable racism of the entertainment industry in this country [the United States]." A review by Noelani Torre of Philippine Daily Inquirer noted: "For some reason, the ninja princess lives in what looks like the Forbidden City. Have the ninjas invade China?" This setting confused NY Daily News critic Jack Mathews, who thought Kasumi was a Chinese princess. Mikel Reparaz of GamesRadar opined the scene in which Kasumi leaves her clan was the film's "most ridiculous" scene and included it in his 2009 list of the 16 "most awesomely bad" video game movie moments. UGO declared Kasumi's "transitioning from martial art fight scene to skydiving without blinking" as the film's defining moment, noting her "keeping conservative in a world full of boob".

Polish web portal Gildia.pl featured the video game version of Kasumi as their "Gamegirl of the Week", but called Aoki's role in the film a "total setback". According to Dan Amrich of Xbox Official Magazine, "the melodrama of rogue ninja Kasumi's search for her brother doesn't work if the people telling the tale don't bother to, you know, act." Roger Moore from Orlando Sentinel opined Natassia Malthe's (the film's Ayane) purple hair "makes her look even less Japanese than Aoki," Kurt Kalata of Hardcore Gaming 101 commented Kasumi was "sadly played by pancake-face Devon Aoki," and Merca Player pointed out Aoki lacked "the 'size to portray "the ninja with the world's most perfect cleavage." Nevertheless, Complex ranked her as tenth on their 2011 list of "hottest women in video game movies," but with a likeness factor of only 52%.

Controversies and unofficial content

Negative reception of the game character included accusations of sexual objectification and a controversy about underage characters. According to Official Xbox Magazine, "the nubile DOA girls have always been slightly controversial, with high-minded types lamenting the gratuitous use of bouncing bosoms. But on Xbox, these criticisms seem to have died away - the sheer brilliance of DOA3s gameplay must have made all gamers, feminists included, realise that Tina, Kasumi et al are actually rather fit."

The Daily Mirror opined that "the sexual titillation might be diverting for an 11-year-old boy as the panties flash and the boobs bounce but, in terms of content, it's hard to believe a scenario in which an 18-year-old Japanese girl like Kasumi, whose favourite food is strawberry yoghurt, would take on a 46-year-old American male professional wrestler and hope to win." Shawn Sines of GameFront used the images of Taki from Soulcalibur II and Kasumi from DOAX2 to illustrate the 2007 critical article about "the video game implementation of modeling female breasts" and used the Dead or Alive series as an example. In 2010, David Houghton of GamesRadar chose , Lara Croft and Soulcaliburs Ivy Valentine as examples of the female video game protagonists who are "all festering adolescent wank-fantasies". That same year, Jeff Marchiafava of Game Informer chose Kasumi as a character that Twilight character Edward Cullen would like because she "is underage". Wirtualna Polska ranked Kasumi from Dead or Alive 4 as second only to Bayonetta among the "most unrealistic and sexist depictions of women in games". Rich Shivener of Joystick Division included "She Kicks High" at number four on his list of the most controversial video game commercials, writing: "In a way, Tecmo is making fun of itself for including excessive cleavage and the like in Dead or Alive games. At least they're honestKasumi totally does kick high, and her fellow femme fatales are flashy, too." In 2012, Kotaku's Harris O'Malley listed "Kasumi, Ayane or Ivy" as examples of objectified female characters in video games. Stephen Crane of Bitmob included Kasumi among "the most iconic female game characters" while arguing that almost all of which "have been incredibly sexualized". Josh Engen of Cheat Code Central used an image of Kasumi to illustrate the "frustrating (and incorrect) preconception" that gamers are sexist. The naked version of Alpha-152 was included in GamesRadar's 2014 list of top seven "uncomfortably sexy video game AI characters".

The underage depiction of Kasumi and a feature in Dead or Alive: Dimensions called Figure Modewhich allows players to capture images of the characters from all angles and store themwere linked to Nintendo's decision to not sell the game in Sweden, allegedly due to the country's strict child pornography laws. Hearing of the Nordic ban and that Dimensions was being sold in Australia with a PG classification, the Minister for Home Affairs Brendan O'Connor and the Australian Classification Board re-examined the game and revoked its classification, although Nintendo Australia assured the board that the game contained no material which could be considered child pornography. Upon re-submission, the game was awarded the stronger (but not age-restricted) M classification and was re-released shortly after. The game's cover art, which featured a high-kicking Kasumi, was slightly altered for the United States release. Reports indicating it was done to appease the ESRB appeared, but a Tecmo Koei spokesperson claimed that "this whole thing is getting blown way out of proportion. The truth is that when we submitted the box art as-is from Japan, there were a few parties both internal and external who thought there might be some issue with the image. Nobody 'demanded' anything be changed, it was just pointed out. You have to pick your battles, and covering up that small bit of the image seemed to be harmless."

Kasumi is a popular subject of unofficial dōjinshi erotic comics in which she often has sexual relationship with Ayane. She has been subject of a number of other unofficial adult media including an erotic film starring Nao Oikawa, a pornographic machinima and an erotic game with a CD featuring erotic vocal sample; 14 of the game's songs were also released separately. A fan mod adds Kasumi to Ultra Street Fighter IV'', mapping her over Chun-Li.

See also
 List of Dead or Alive characters
 Ninja in popular culture

References

External links

 Official websites DOA5, DOA6
 Official guide to Kasumi in DOA5 (Prima Games)

Clone characters in video games
Dead or Alive (franchise) characters
Female characters in video games
Fictional female martial artists
Fictional female ninja
Fictional fugitives
Fictional hermits
Fictional Japanese people in video games
Fictional martial artists in video games
Fictional Ninjutsu practitioners
Fictional super soldiers
Fictional swordfighters in video games
Fictional volleyball players
Genetically engineered characters in video games
Koei Tecmo protagonists
Ninja characters in video games
Ninja Gaiden characters
Princess characters in video games
Teenage characters in video games
Video game bosses
Video game characters introduced in 1996
Video game characters who can teleport
Video game mascots
Woman soldier and warrior characters in video games